Entrance Island is a low island with an area of 6.1 ha.  It lies at the entrance to Macquarie Harbour in Western Tasmania at an area known as Hell's Gates.  It contains a light beacon and jetty.

Fauna
Recorded breeding seabird species are the little penguin (100 pairs) and short-tailed shearwater (1900 pairs).  The metallic skink is present.

References

Islands of Tasmania
Macquarie Harbour